Provo College is a private for-profit college focused on health care programs and located in Provo, Utah.

History 

What is now Provo College opened in 1984 under the name of Dental Careers Institute. Its name changed to Advanced Careers Institute and finally, in December 1989, it was named Provo College. The name change reflected the broadened scope of the college with the addition of curriculum in court reporting and medical transcription.

In April 1992, the school was acquired by the Center for Professional Studies, Inc. and relocated to its current location. During 1996 and 1997, the college expanded its offerings and added the Associate of Applied Science degree to all its programs. Subsequently, in 2005, Provo College was granted approval from ACCSC to change its degree offering from Associate of Applied Science to Associate of Science. Bachelor's degrees were added in 2013.

See also

 List of colleges and universities in Utah

References

External links

 

Buildings and structures in Provo, Utah
Private universities and colleges in Utah
Educational institutions established in 1984
Universities and colleges in Utah County, Utah
1984 establishments in Utah
For-profit universities and colleges in the United States